Nahr-e Poshteh (also Romanized as Nahr Poshteh; also known as Nahrpushteh) is a village in Milajerd Rural District, Milajerd District, Komijan County, Markazi Province, Iran. At the 2006 census, its population was 299, in 72 families.

References 

Populated places in Komijan County